Andrew Hoffman (born February 15, 1982) is an American football defensive tackle who played for the University of Virginia and was on the practice squad of the Cleveland Browns during the 2005 and 2006 seasons in the National Football League.

College career
Hoffman was at the University of Virginia from 2000 through 2004, and he started in all but one game from 2002 to 2004.  His senior year in 2004 was his best season, earning an honorable mention on the "All ACC team" and praise from head coach Al Groh as the best player on the defense.

References

1982 births
Living people
Sportspeople from Fairfax, Virginia
American football defensive tackles
Virginia Cavaliers football players
Cleveland Browns players